GEB Network  (formerly known as Golden Eagle Broadcasting) is a digital satellite television network, which airs primarily Christian and family programming. Oral Roberts founded it in 1996. GEB is owned by Oral Roberts University and is headquartered in Tulsa, Oklahoma.

History
On January 24, 1996, KWMJ TV 53 Tulsa began airing with 24-hour programming. The launch of KWMJ included programs such as Oral Roberts's Chronicles of Faith, which was a 30-minute program showing footage from his tent crusades and the Oral Roberts University Chapel. The first live chapel aired on January 26, 1996.

On November 1, 1998, Golden Eagle Broadcasting was picked up by stations and viewers across the country and the world via television and the internet. By November 29, 1999, KWMJ became KGEB, the flagship affiliate of Golden Eagle Broadcasting. In 2003, KGEB became the digital channel, KGEB-DT.

Programming
GEB provides Christian and what it describes as family-friendly programming, with programs such as:

 The 700 Club
 Adventures in Dry Gulch
 Andrew Wommack
 Being Your Best With Trey Johnson
 Campmeeting
 Christ the Healer
 Creflo Dollar – Changing Your World
 Christian Music Countdown
 David Jeremiah
 David Lombardi
 Deborah Sweetin
 Donkey Ollie
 Drenda: With Drenda Keesee
 Dr. Robert Jeffress - Pathway to Victory
 Gary Keesee: Fixing the Money Thing
 Hellen Thomas
 In Touch With Charles Stanley
 International Fellowship of Christians and Jews
 Life Today with James Robison
 Jerusalem Dateline
 The Jewish Jesus
 Jewish Voice with Jonathan Bernis
 Joel Osteen
 John Muratori
 Joseph Prince
 Joyce Meyer Enjoying Everyday Life
 K.I.C.K.S. Club
 Les Feldick
 Lift Up Jesus With Dudley Rutherford
 Love a Child
 Manna-Fest with Perry Stone
 Dr. Maureen Anderson
 Mark Hankins
 NASA X
 Pastor Robert Morris Ministries
 ORU Chapel
 ORU Commencement (Annually)
 Sarah Ann Speaks Tips
 Sid Roth's It's Supernatural
 Super Book 
 That You Might Have Life with Dr. Lynn Hiles
 The Gospel Truth with Andrew Wommack
 The Word For Living
 Throne Room Prayer
 Today With Marilyn and Sarah Marilyn Hickey
 Victory with Pastor Paul
 World Impact with Billy Wilson

Original programming
GEB Network also airs original programming. Through the years, the network has partnered with Oral Roberts University to air several university specials. Since 2008, ORU men's basketball games have been featured on the network. From 2011 to 2013, The Gathering at ORU aired on GEB with special appearances from pastors and ministry leaders including Dr. Steve Munsey, Clifton Taulbert, and Psalmist Judy Jacobs. The ORU Christmas Joy's concert experience aired on GEB in 2011 and 2012. Another ministry special, ORU Ignite, featuring Dr. Charles Stanley, Billy Wilson, Mark Rutland, Jentezen Franklin, and more aired in summer 2013.

In 2010, GEB partnered with Empowered21 to produce and air their inaugural global conference, which was recorded in the Mabee Center.

In wake of the Moore, Oklahoma, tornado, GEB and Oral Roberts University met the victims and partners at Convoy of Hope to help provide relief. The stories were captured on GEB America Special Moore, Oklahoma, Tornado on May 24, 2013.

GEB's digital channel, KGEB-DT, also airs original programming, including the United States Army Field Band in April 2012, the US congressional debate in October 2012, and YBC Lasting Legacies series in 2019.

In February 2017. GEB began broadcasting Oral Roberts University baseball home games.

Coverage
On June 23, 2010, Golden Eagle Broadcasting Network was added to DirecTV. On October 1, 2012, Golden Eagle Broadcasting changed its name to GEB America as an integrated identity for broadcast, internet, and social media. In August 2013, GEB America released its first smartphone app for iPhone and Android devices, allowing live streaming access as well as the program schedule and the Living Well podcast.

In May 2013, GEB began broadcasting in the Houston, TX area including Montgomery, Galveston and Lake Jackson; reaching a potential audience of 5,000,000.

In March 2014, GEB debuted on The Roku Streaming Player. This expansion helps GEB reach millions of additional viewers through its streaming channels. For more than a decade, GEB partnered with Sky Angel TV for their streaming services, until the companies disband in January 2014.

In Early 2014 GEB began web streaming via LifeStream.tv

In May 2014, GEB began broadcasting on high-definition television (HDTV). The award-winning religious network is one of the first to convert to an HD format.

In February 2017 GEB began broadcasting in the Orlando Florida area, on WACX Channel 55.3

In February 2017 GEB began broadcasting on Apple TV.

In March 2018 GEB began broadcasting on Amazon TV.

In April 2018 GEB began broadcasting over the air in Greenville, South Carolina.

In late 2018 began transitioning to GEB as an integrated identity for better worldwide positioning in broadcast, OTT, internet, and social media.

In early 2019 GEB began broadcasting over the air in Atlantic City, New Jersey, and Philadelphia, Pennsylvania area

In mid-2019 GEB began broadcasting over the air in Nashville, Tennessee, and Alton, Illinois

In late 2019 GEB began broadcasting over the air in Greenville, South, Knoxville, Tennessee

In 2020 GEB began broadcasting over the air in Tri-Cities Tennessee / Virginia, Louisville, Kentucky, and WBBM Scottsville, Kentucky is currently airing select GEB Network programs daily.

In 2021 GEB began broadcasting over the air on KRET Palm Springs, Florida, and on KFPB Phoenix Arizona.

Executives
Dr. Charles Scott is V.P of External Affairs for Oral Roberts University. David Groves is the General Manager.  Bill Lee, is the Director of Engineering.

Charitable and humanitarian initiatives
GEB offers internships for ORU and other college students.

In 2012, GEB (GEB America) partnered with Convoy of Hope to provide relief to Hurricane Sandy victims.

On May 20, 2013, Moore, Oklahoma and surrounding areas were devastated by the violent 2013 Moore tornado. GEB partnered with ORU and Convoy of Hope to help relieve Oklahomans in need. GEB America also was instrumental in getting the story out nationwide via their television network.

Headquarters
GEB studios are headquartered in Tulsa, Oklahoma at the Mabee Center on the Oral Roberts University campus. Over the years programs like Big 12 Conference This Week in Big 12, Deborah Sweetin, Hellen Thomas, YBC Lasting Legacies, and World Impact with Dr. Billy Wilson, have been recorded on-site in various studios. The Mabee Center and GEB have partnered together several times for special events. On October 13, 2013, GEB was a sponsor at the Oklahoma Music Hall of Fame. The Mabee Center was one of the members that were inducted into the 2013 class.

Terrestrial affiliates
GEB America programming is carried on KGEB in Tulsa, Oklahoma and as a subchannel of other low-power TV stations:

KBPX-LD 46.5, Houston, Texas
KDVD-LD 50.5, Phoenix, Arizona
KRET-CD 45.7, Palm Springs, California
WBNM-LD 50.7, Louisville, Kentucky
WACX 55.3, Orlando, Florida
WLFG 68.9, Grundy, Virginia
WJDE-CD 31.8, Nashville, Tennessee
WSJT-LD 15.2, Atlantic City, New Jersey
WWYA-LD 28.1, Greenville, South Carolina

Awards and recognition
In 2013, the National Religious Broadcasters Association nominated GEB America for two awards at the 2014 NRB Media Awards. GEB won the Best TV Public Service Announcement and was also nominated for Station of the Year.

In 2016, the National Religious Broadcasters Association awarded KGEB the TV Station of the Year.

References

External links
GEB Network Homepage

Television networks in the United States
Religious television stations in the United States
Oral Roberts University
Television channels and stations established in 1996
Companies based in Tulsa, Oklahoma